Pediococcus is a genus of gram-positive lactic acid bacteria, placed within the family of Lactobacillaceae. They usually occur in pairs or tetrads, and divide along two planes of symmetry, as do the other lactic acid cocci genera Aerococcus and Tetragenococcus.  They are purely homofermentative.  Pediococcus dextrinicus has recently been reassigned to the genus Lapidilactobacillus.

Food processing
Pediococcus is, along with other lactic acid bacteria such as Leuconostoc and Lactobacillus, responsible for the fermentation of cabbage, making it sauerkraut. In this process, the sugars in fresh cabbage are fermented to lactic acid, which gives sauerkraut a sour flavour and good keeping qualities.
Pediococcus bacteria are usually considered contaminants of beer and wine, although their presence is sometimes desired in beer styles such as lambic and Berliner Weisse.  Certain Pediococcus isolates produce diacetyl which gives a buttery or butterscotch aroma to some wines (such as Chardonnay) and a few styles of beer. Pediococcus species are often used in silage inoculants.  Pediococci are used as probiotics, and are commonly added as beneficial microbes in the creation of sausages, cheeses and yogurts.

Species
The genus Pediococcus comprises the following species:
 Pediococcus acidilactici Lindner 1887 (Approved Lists 1980)
 Pediococcus argentinicus De Bruyne et al. 2008
 Pediococcus cellicola Zhang et al. 2005
 Pediococcus claussenii Dobson et al. 2002
 Pediococcus damnosus Claussen 1903 (Approved Lists 1980)

 Pediococcus ethanolidurans Liu et al. 2006

 Pediococcus inopinatus Back 1988

 Pediococcus parvulus Günther and White 1961 (Approved Lists 1980)
 Pediococcus pentosaceus Mees 1934 (Approved Lists 1980)
 "Pediococcus perniciosus" Claussen 1903
 Pediococcus siamensis Tanasupawat et al. 2007
 Pediococcus stilesii Franz et al. 2006

Phylogeny
The currently accepted taxonomy is based on the List of Prokaryotic names with Standing in Nomenclature and the phylogeny is based on whole-genome sequences.

References

Further reading

External links
 Pediococcus at Milk the Funk Wiki
 Pediococcus at BacDive -  the Bacterial Diversity Metadatabase

Lactobacillaceae
Bacteria used in dairy products
Bacteria genera